Susan McKenna-Lawlor (born 3 March 1935) is an Irish astrophysicist. She is an emeritus professor of experimental physics at Maynooth University.

Early life and education 
Susan was born in Dublin on 3 March 1935. She studied experimental physics at University College Dublin. She was a research assistant at the Dublin Institute for Advanced Studies between 1957 and 1966. A lecturer in St. Patrick's College, Maynooth, in 1986 she was appointed a professor in the Dept of Experimental Physics.

Space Technology Ireland Ltd
In 1986 she founded the space instrumentation company Space Technology Ireland Ltd (STIL) with venture capitalist Dermot Desmond. STIL manufactures instruments for space missions and McKenna-Lawlor is the managing director. It was established on the south campus of St. Patrick's College, Maynooth.

Research and career 
McKenna-Lawlor was the principal investigator for the experiment EPA (Energetic Particles) on the European Space Agency (ESA) Giotto mission. 

McKenna-Lawlor led an international team of scientists in building a particle detector capable of detecting energies between 30 kiloelectronvolts and several megaelectronvolts for the Soviet Union's Phobos spacecraft in 1988. The success of the detector led Soviet scientists to ask her to contribute a similar device for their 1994 Mars mission.

McKenna-Lawlor was Co-Investigator for the experiment RAPID on board the European Space Agency (ESA) Cluster mission.

She developed instruments to monitor the solar wind on Mars for the ESA Mars Express mission.

STIL designed the onboard Electrical Support System processor unit for the Rosetta spacecraft. McKenna-Lawlor also represented Ireland on the Steering Board of the Rosetta's Philae lander that touched down on comet 67P/Churyumov–Gerasimenko.

Awards and recognition 
She was a winner of the Rehab People of the Year Award in 1986. She was elected to the International Academy of Astronautics and in 2005 she received an honorary DSc from the University of Ulster for her contributions to astrophysics.

She was a member of the National University of Ireland Senate and of Maynooth University's Governing Authority.

Bibliography 

 McKenna-Lawlor, S. (1968). Astronomy in Ireland from 1780. Vistas in Astronomy.

 McKenna-Lawlor, S. (2003). Whatever Shines Should be Observed. Springer Netherlands. .

Susan McKenna-Lawlor has published or co-authored over 250 scientific papers.

References

External links
McKenna-Lawlor at Maynooth University

1935 births
Living people
Alumni of University College Dublin
Women astrophysicists
Experimental physicists
Irish astronomers
Irish women scientists
Women astronomers
Academics of St Patrick's College, Maynooth
Academics of Maynooth University
Scientists from Dublin (city)
Women planetary scientists
Planetary scientists
Academics of the Dublin Institute for Advanced Studies